The 10th Dallas–Fort Worth Film Critics Association Awards, given by the Dallas-Fort Worth Film Critics Association on 4 January 2005, honored the best in film for 2004. The organization, founded in 1990, includes 63 film critics for print, radio, television, and internet publications based in north Texas.

Top 10 films
 Million Dollar Baby (Academy Award for Best Picture)
 Sideways
 Finding Neverland
 The Aviator
 Eternal Sunshine of the Spotless Mind
 Ray
 Kinsey
 The Incredibles
 A Very Long Engagement (Un long dimanche de fiançailles)
 Hotel Rwanda

Winners

Best Actor: 
Paul Giamatti – Sideways
Best Actress: 
Hilary Swank – Million Dollar Baby
Best Animated Film: 
The Incredibles
Best Director: 
Martin Scorsese – The Aviator
Best Documentary Film: 
Fahrenheit 9/11
Best Film:
 Million Dollar Baby 
Best Foreign Language Film: 
A Very Long Engagement (Un long dimanche de fiançailles) • France/United States
Best Supporting Actor: 
Thomas Haden Church – Sideways
Best Supporting Actress: 
Virginia Madsen – Sideways
Russell Smith Award: 
Maria Full of Grace
Worst Film: 
Christmas with the Kranks

References

External links
Dallas-Fort Worth Film Critics Association official website

2004
2004 film awards